The Hooper Building is a historic commercial building in downtown Cincinnati, Ohio, United States. Built to a design by a master architect, it is named for an executive of its first occupant, and it has been named a historic site.

Description and history 
From its establishment until 1885, the John Church Company operated from premises at 66 W. 4th Street, selling musical instruments and printed music. It chose to move in 1885, and in 1893 it arranged for the construction of the present structure in the 100 block of 4th Street. The company's president was William Hooper at this time, and as such, the new building was given his name.

Built of brick on a foundation of limestone, the seven-story Hooper Building features a symmetrical facade designed in a variant of the Queen Anne style. Among its most prominent themes are its division into five bays on both the front and the western side, with the three central bays being recessed from the corners. On the top story, the normal lintels give way to an arcade decorated with limestone keystones carven in the shapes of scrolls.  Masonry courses divide the building into several vertical components: the second and third stories are separated by a large beltcourse, while lintels are placed throughout the facade.

In 1976, much of West 4th Street was designated a historic district, the West Fourth Street Historic District, and added to the National Register of Historic Places. Although the district's boundaries did not include the Hooper Building, it was expanded eastward in 1979, and the Hooper was included as a contributing property in the larger district. One year later, the building was individually listed on the Register, due to its well-preserved historic architecture. Dozens of other properties in Cincinnati, including the Brittany Apartment Building, were added to the Register at the same time as part of a multiple property submission of buildings designed by Samuel Hannaford.

References

Commercial buildings completed in 1893
National Register of Historic Places in Cincinnati
Office buildings in Cincinnati
Queen Anne architecture in Ohio
Historic district contributing properties in Ohio
Commercial buildings on the National Register of Historic Places in Ohio
1893 establishments in Ohio